Area code 970 is a telephone area code in the North American Numbering Plan (NANP) serving most of the western and northern parts of the U.S. state of Colorado. The numbering plan area includes Aspen, Breckenridge, Durango, Estes Park, Fort Collins, Glenwood Springs, Grand Junction, Greeley, Loveland, Silverthorne, Steamboat Springs, and Vail. It was established on April 2, 1995 in an area code split of area code 303, which was retained by the Denver area.

Ten-digit dialing
Area code 970 has PCS telephone numbers assigned for the central office code 988 in the Fort Collins exchange. As of October 17, 2020, 988 has been assigned by law as a three-digit code for the National Suicide Prevention Lifeline. To avoid conflicts in switching systems, the Federal Communications Commission has ordered telecommunication carriers of 83 area codes, including 970, to transition to ten-digit dialing, even when the area code is not part of an overlay plan. Alternatively, the 988 prefix may be retired in the local numbering plan. Per the timeline set by the North American Numbering Plan Administrator, permissive dialing begins on April 24, 2021 and ten-digit dialing is required starting on October 24, 2021.

See also
 List of Colorado area codes

References

External links

970
970